Savitha Radhakrishnan is a voice actor in the south Indian cinema industry.

Career 
Savitha made her debut as a child voice actor in the movie Repati Pourulu and continued for many movies as a voice actor in both Tamil and Telugu movies. She later as a teen lent her voice for female lead actress Vinodhini for a Tamil movie Annai Vayal (1992). Her major break was with Jeans lending her voice to Aishwarya Rai's character. She has majorly lent her voice in Tamil and Telugu languages extending to Kannada (movies and advertisements) and a bit of Hindi (advertisements) and in Malayalam ads and movies for Tamil-speaking characters that include Lakshmi Rai for Annan Thambi and Gauthami Nair for Diamond Necklace.

An M.B.A. graduate who majored in advertising from Annamalai University, she first received attention when the exceptional Indian cinema director Shankar selected her to lend her voice for the then Miss World Aishwarya Rai in Jeans. In Telugu, her first work was for Simran in Kalisundam Raa and later she went on to lend her voice for Simran in all most all her movies. She has lent her voice for Aarthi Agarwal from her debut film Nuvvu Naaku Nachav, "I got the Nandi award for this movie," recalls Savitha. She lent voice for Trisha's first Telugu film, Varsham, Richa's in Nuvve Kavali, and for Asin in Amma Nanna O Tamila Ammayi, she lent her voice a lot for Simran, Jyothika and Trisha. Her major works are Thulladha Manamum Thullum, Priyamanavale, Panchathantiram, Kushi, Dhool, Chandramukhi, and Sillunu Oru Kaadhal. In the movie Deiva Thirumagal she lent her voice for Amala Paul whereas her daughter lent her voice for Sara Arjun.

She lent her voice for Jyothika Saravanan in the Tamil film Chandramukhi and for Simran and Jyothika Saravanan in 12B. She had also lent her voice for the actress playing Nina's character in Chitti serial. In Parthiban Kanavu she lent her voice for Sneha for one of her dual appearances.

List of movies worked a voice actor

TV / Web Series

Discography

Accolades

References

External links
 

Living people
Annamalai University alumni
Nandi Award winners
Tamil Nadu State Film Awards winners
Artists from Chennai
Year of birth missing (living people)
Indian voice actresses
Tamil playback singers